Samuel or Sam Anderson may refer to:

Arts and entertainment
 Sam Anderson (born 1945), American television actor
 Sam Sneed (Sam Anderson, born 1968), American record producer and rapper
 Sam Anderson (Tamil actor) (born 1977), Indian actor in Tamil language films 
 Samuel Anderson (actor) (born 1982), English stage and television actor
 Sam Anderson (The Walking Dead), character in television series The Walking Dead

Military and politics
 Samuel Anderson (politician) (1773–1850), U.S. Representative from Pennsylvania, U.S. navy surgeon and officer with the Pennsylvania militia
 Samuel Read Anderson (1804–1883), Confederate general in the American Civil War
 Samuel Anderson (surveyor) (1839–1881), British army surveyor
 Samuel E. Anderson (1906–1982), United States Air Force general

Sports
 Sam Anderson (footballer) (fl. 1910s–1920s), Scottish footballer
 Samuel Anderson (athlete) (1929–2012), Cuban hurdler
 Sam Anderson (rugby league) (born 1991), Australian rugby league footballer

Others
 Samuel Anderson (Australian settler) (1803–1863), Australian agriculturist and explorer
 Sam Anderson (writer), American journalist, critic at large for The New York Times Magazine

Other uses
 Samuel Anderson Architects, New York City based architecture firm